The Orel VH2 Streamline is a French ultralight aircraft that was designed by Jean-Francois Boudet and is under development by Orel Aircraft of Selles-Saint-Denis, introduced at the AERO Friedrichshafen show in 2015. The aircraft will be supplied complete and ready-to-fly.

Design and development
The VH2 Streamline was designed to comply with the Fédération Aéronautique Internationale microlight rules. It features a cantilever low-wing, low-mounted tailplane, an enclosed cockpit with two-seats-in-side-by-side configuration under a bubble canopy, fixed tricycle landing gear and a single engine in tractor configuration.

The aircraft is made from carbon fibre. It has an electrically-operated canopy and a side-stick controller. The standard engine used is the  ULPower UL260i four-stroke powerplant.

As of 2015 the company was looking for a partner to bring the aircraft to production.

Variants
VH2 Streamline
Model with fixed landing gear,  ULPower UL260i engine,  gross weight, first flown in 2014. To be sold complete and ready to fly.
VH2X Streamline
Proposed model with retractable landing gear,  engine,  gross weight, not yet flown. To be sold as a quick-build kit for amateur construction.

Specifications (VH2 Streamline)

References

External links

VH2 Streamline
2010s French ultralight aircraft
Homebuilt aircraft
Single-engined tractor aircraft
Aircraft first flown in 2014
Low-wing aircraft